Catopta danieli is a moth in the family Cossidae. It was described by Harry Kendon Clench in 1958. It is found in Sichuan, China.

References

Moths described in 1958
Catoptinae